Božidar Peter (3 March 1938 – 24 April 2012) was a former Croatian handball player, coach and journalist.

Peter was part of the first successful generation of Partizan Bjelovar. With the club he won the Yugoslav First League three time, the Yugoslav Cup once and got to the final of the European Champions Cup in 1962 where they lost to Frisch Auf Göppingen.

He played for the Yugoslav national team at 1958 World Championship in German Democratic Republic and 1961 World Championship in West Germany.

He moved to Rijeka where he finished his playing career and began coaching in RK Kvarner. He  worked in Novi list as a journalist.

Honours
Partizan Bjelovar
Yugoslav First League 
Winner (3): 1957-58, 1960-61, 1966-67
Runner-up (4): 1958-59, 1959-60, 1962-63, 1963-64, 
Yugoslav Cup
Winner (1): 1960
European Champions Cup 
Finalist (1): 1962

Kvarner
Regional League of Primorje and Istra
Winner (2):  1967–68, 1968–69
Runner-up (1): 1965-66

Croatian Unique League
Winner (1): 1969-70

Yugoslavia
1958 World Championship - 8th
1961 World Championship - 9th 

Individual
Best sportsperson in Bjelovar - 1957

Sources
Razvoj rukometa u Hrvatskoj - 1986
Partizan Bjelovar - 1982
50 godina rukometa u Rijeci - 2005
Slike rukometne bajke Bjelovara 2006

References

Yugoslav male handball players
Croatian handball coaches
RK Kvarner players
RK Kvarner coaches
Sportspeople from Bjelovar
Handball players from Rijeka
1938 births
2012 deaths